Mieczysław Górowski (February 5, 1941 – August 31, 2011) was a Polish graphic artist.

Early life and education
He was born in Miłkowa 1941 Nowy Sącz. He studied at the Cracow Academy of Fine Arts from 1959 to 1966 where he later served as a professor on the Faculty of Industrial Design.

Career
He started designing posters in 1966 and has created over 400 posters. In addition, he worked in interior design and painting but, as the artist said about himself: "For many years I have been creating posters - this is the main direction of my artistic and design activity". His art can be found in collections in Europe as well as North America. He died in Cracow.

Major awards
1983 - First Prize - International Poster Invitational, Fort Collins, Colorado
1986, 1987 - International Poster Salon, Paris, France
1987 - International Art Directors Club Exhibition, New York
1989 - Honourable Prize - International Poster Biennal - Warsaw 1989,
1992 - First Prize - International Biennale of the Poster, Mexico
2000 - Master's Eye Award - at International Poster Triennal – Trnava, Slovakia

References

External links
Personal website (maintained in his honor)
Contemporary Posters - Mieczylaw Gorowski
Mieczyslaw Gorowski @ Poster.pl
Swiss Poster Museum - Gorowski

1941 births
2011 deaths
Polish poster artists
Jan Matejko Academy of Fine Arts alumni